The International Animation Festival Hiroshima is a biennial animation festival hosted in Hiroshima, Japan. The festival was founded in 1985 by Association International du Film d'Animation or ASIFA as International Animation Festival for the World Peace. The city of Hiroshima was one of the sites of nuclear bombings in 1945 at the end of World War II and it was chosen to inspire thoughts of unity through the arts. The festival is considered one of the most respected animated film festival, along with Annecy International Animated Film Festival, Ottawa International Animation Festival, and Zagreb World Festival of Animated Films.

The first two festivals were held in odd years: 1985 and 1987. Since 1990, the festival has been held biennially in even years. In 2008, the 12th Festival took place for 5 days (August 7–11). The city of Hiroshima co-hosts the festival, which takes place in JMS Aster Plaza near the Hiroshima Peace Memorial Park at the center of Hiroshima city.

The founding of the festival is largely credited to Sayoko Kinoshita and her late husband Renzo Kinoshita. The married couple were renowned figures in the independent animation world and also founders of ASIFA's Japan chapter. Sayoko Kinoshita has been the festival director since the first festival and is now also the president of ASIFA.

In the festival's first year in 1985, the Grand Prize was awarded to Broken Down Film by Osamu Tezuka. Tezuka became one of the members of the jury for the following festival. This cycle has often repeated and many of the grand prize winners have become judges for the following festival.

In 2010, the Festival had nearly 1,937 entries from 58 countries and regions, and had more than 34,516 participants.

In November 2020, the city of Hiroshima announced ending its partnership with ASIFA, and plans to replace the festival.

Grand Prize winners

Notable Hiroshima Prize winners
1985 - The Big Snit- Richard Condie (Canada)
1987 - The Dreamless Sleep - David Anderson (U.K.)
1990 - The Hill Farm- Mark Baker (U.K.)
1992 - Cat and Company -  Alexander Guryev (Russia)
1994 - The Village- Mark Baker (U.K.)
1996 - The Monk and the Fish- Michael Dudok de Wit (France) 
1998 - The Mermaid - Alexander Petrov (Russia)
2000 - One Day a Man Bought a House - Pjotr Sapegin (Norway)
2002 - Dog - Suzie Templeton (U.K.)
2004 - Louise - Anita Lebeau (Canada)
2006 - Wolf Daddy -  Chang Hyung yun (Republic of Korea)
2008 - La Maison en Petits Cubes - Kunio Kato (Japan)
2010 - Divers In The Rain -  Priit Parn, Olga Parn (Estonia)
2012 - Kali the Little Vampire - Regina Pessoa (Portugal/France/Canada/Switzerland)
2014 - Symphony No.42 - Réka Bucsi (Hungary)
2016 - Among the black waves - Anna Budanova (Russia)
2018 - Bond  -  Judit Wunder (Hungary)
2020 - Am I a Wolf?  -  Amir Houshang Moein  (Iran)

See also
List of international animation festivals
Academy Award for Best Animated Short Film

References

External links
 
Hiroshima International Animation Festival at the Internet Movie Database

1985 establishments in Japan
Animation film festivals
Film festivals in Japan
Film festivals established in 1985
Culture in Hiroshima